This is a list of football players who have played at least one first team match for Landskrona BoIS in Allsvenskan (1924–2005) or Svenska Serien (1923–24).

Key

Players in Allsvenskan and Svenska Serien

Up to date as of 19 June 2022.

* Unknown first name

References
 General
 
 Specific

 https://svenskfotboll.se/superettan/lag/?flid=25522

 
Landskrona BoIS
Association football player non-biographical articles